St John's College is an independent co-educational day school in the village of Old St Mellons in Cardiff, Wales. It is the choir school of Wales' national Catholic cathedral, Cardiff Metropolitan Cathedral.

History of St John's College

De La Salle Prep School 
The De La Salle School for Boys, established in the 1930s, was originally based at 9 Richmond Crescent, Cardiff at a site formerly occupied by St Peter's Catholic Young Men's Society. The School was run by the Brothers of the Christian Schools and sought to provide an education within a strong Christian context. Later, the school moved to a site off Greenway Road near Trowbridge in north-east Cardiff.

In the 1980s the De La Salle School faced imminent closure. A group of parents, some of whom had been pupils at the school, were determined to keep the school open and in 1987, decided to establish St John's College.

St John's College 
The new school, still located at Greenway Road, opened its doors to both boys and girls up to the age of 16; A Levels were introduced in 1996. The founding Headmaster, Dr David Neville, put the academic and choral foundations at the very heart of the new college and St John's became the choir school to the Metropolitan Cathedral of St David, providing choristers for Sunday Mass and other weekday services.

As the school roll grew, it became apparent that St John's had outgrown the site at Greenway Road. In 1995 the college moved to its current site, Ty-to-maen, a mansion built in 1885–9 by the Cardiff architect E. Bruce Vaughan for Richard Allen of Spillers flour mills. It was later owned by Sir William Edgar Nicholls, the manager of Spillers, who gave the house and its estate to the Cardiff Royal Infirmary, when it became the William Nicholls Convalescent Home.

The Cathedral Choir

At the heart of St John's College is the Cathedral Choral Foundation.  As the choir school to Cardiff Metropolitan Cathedral, St John's College provides the boy and girl choristers (ages 8–18) for weekly Sunday masses, also participating in an annual Christmas Concert at St David's Hall and numerous performance opportunities throughout the year.

Over the years the Cathedral Choir has appeared in a major Hollywood film,  participated in radio broadcasts for BBC Radio Wales and BBC Radio Four, performed with the world-renowned consort The Tallis Scholars, sung at Nôtre Dame, Paris and performed alongside the Prague and Cardiff Philharmonic Orchestras in performances of Mahler's Third Symphony. 

In addition, the choir has also given performances in Madrid, El Escorial, the cathedrals of Bruges and Ghent, St David's Hall, Christ Church Cathedral Oxford, Brecon Cathedral,  Westminster Abbey, St Paul's Cathedral and the Royal Welsh College of Music and Drama.

College structure 
St John's College is divided into four sections: the Nursery and Infants (ages 3–7); the Junior School (ages 8–11); the Senior School (ages 12–16); the Sixth Form College (ages 17–18).

House system 
Pupils and students at St John's College are divided into four houses, each named after a significant person from Welsh or Catholic history:
 Bute – the family who owned Cardiff Castle and were responsible for much of the industrialisation of Cardiff.
 De La Salle – John Baptiste De La Salle, the Catholic patron saint of teachers and founder of the De La Salle schools
 Mostyn – Francis Mostyn who served a Archbishop of Cardiff from 1921 to 1939
 St David's – named after the patron saint of Wales

The house names were inherited from the old De La Salle school and are an important part of the St John's heritage. A recent house competition allowed pupils to submit designs for new House Shields, one set for Juniors, Infants and Nursery, another for the Senior School and Sixth Form.

College achievements
The examination results achieved by the school are among the best in the UK. In 2017 it was the highest-ranked secondary school in the UK with 98% of pupils attaining A* to B at Advanced Level. This led to St John's being named 'Welsh Independent Secondary School of the Year' in the Sunday Times 'Parent Power' annual supplement.

The school has successfully participated in the F1 in Schools competition to design and build a miniature racing car. In 2019, Infinity Racing, a team of 12–13 year old pupils from the school won the Development Class National Finals and competed in the World Finals in Abu Dhabi. Most recently in 2022, Blackout, a team of 15-16 year old pupils also from the school, became runners-up to Team Hydron in the World Finals in Silverstone after achieving the fastest average race time at the competition. They also managed to achieve the Fastest Car in UK History, recording 1.036 seconds at the 2021 Virtual National Finals.

References

External links 
St John's College website
Cardiff Cathedral Choir website
Profile on the ISC website
Estyn inspection reports

Private schools in Cardiff
Cathedral schools
1987 establishments in Wales
Roman Catholic private schools in the Archdiocese of Cardiff
Educational institutions established in 1987